Kettle Moraine is a large moraine in the state of Wisconsin, United States. It stretches from Walworth County in the south to Kewaunee County in the north.  It has also been referred to as the Kettle Range and, in geological texts, as the Kettle Interlobate Moraine.

Background
The moraine was created when the Green Bay Lobe of the Laurentide Ice Sheet, on the west, collided with the Lake Michigan Lobe of that glacier, on the east, depositing sediment. The western lobe formed Green Bay, Lake Winnebago and the Horicon Marsh. The major part of the Kettle Moraine area is considered interlobate moraine, though other types of moraine features, and other glacial features are common.

The moraine is dotted with kettles caused by buried glacial ice that calved off the terminus of a receding glacier and got entirely or partly buried in glacial sediment and subsequently melted. This process left depressions ranging from small ponds to large lakes and enclosed valleys. The largest include Holy Hill, Pulford Peak and Lapham Peak. Elkhart Lake, Geneva Lake, and Little Cedar Lake are among the larger kettles now filled by lakes. Kames are also found in the kettle moraine area, and are mounds of compressed glacial till.

Parts of the area have been protected in the Kettle Moraine State Forest.

Recreation 

Outdoor recreation opportunities include hiking, biking, cross-country skiing, snowshoeing, horseback riding, and snowmobiling. Fourteen trailheads are dispersed throughout the Northern Unit of the Kettle Moraine State Forest and 17 in the Southern Unit.

References

External links
Summary of the geological history of Kettle Moraine, northern unit, Wisconsin Department of Natural Resources
"Northern Kettle Interlobate Moraine", from Geology of Ice Age National Scientific Reserve of Wisconsin by Robert F. Black
Kettle Moraine Geological Society

Geology of Wisconsin
Landforms of Walworth County, Wisconsin
Landforms of Waukesha County, Wisconsin
Landforms of Washington County, Wisconsin
Landforms of Fond du Lac County, Wisconsin
Landforms of Sheboygan County, Wisconsin
Landforms of Kewaunee County, Wisconsin
Moraines of the United States